Benjamín Prado Casas (4 January 1926 – 7 March 2022) was a Chilean politician. A member of the Christian Democratic Party, he served in the Senate of Chile from 1965 to 1973. He died in Concón on 7 March 2022, at the age of 96.

References

1926 births
2022 deaths
People from Valparaíso
Chilean people of Spanish descent
Chilean Roman Catholics
National Falange politicians 
Christian Democratic Party (Chile) politicians
Senators of the XLV Legislative Period of the National Congress of Chile
Senators of the XLVI Legislative Period of the National Congress of Chile
Senators of the XLVII Legislative Period of the National Congress of Chile
20th-century Chilean lawyers
University of Chile alumni